Archibald White (1871–1920) was a Test match cricket umpire.  He umpired 8 Test matches in all, from his first - the England v South Africa match at Johannesburg in February 1899 to his final outing in the England v South Africa test at the Oval in 1912.

References

1871 births
English Test cricket umpires
1920 deaths